The Fairbanks Exploration Company was the major economic force in the growth of Fairbanks, Alaska during its gold rush years in the early 20th century.  In the 1920s the company built a number of housing units for its workers.  A cluster of at least eight of these is known to have survived on the east side of Illinois Street, of which four have retained historical integrity.  Located at 505, 507, 521, and 523 Illinois Street, they are all similarly built Bungalow-style wood-frame buildings,  stories in height, with a hip roof and projecting hipped wings.  The complex includes a five-stall garage which served all four houses, as well as two greenhouses.  At the time of their listing on the National Register of Historic Places in 1997, this group of houses was being rehabilitated for use as a bed and breakfast inn.

See also
National Register of Historic Places listings in Fairbanks North Star Borough, Alaska
Mary Lee Davis House, used as housing for F.E. Company executives

References

1927 establishments in Alaska
Houses completed in 1927
Buildings and structures in Fairbanks, Alaska
Bungalow architecture in Alaska
Economy of Fairbanks, Alaska
Gold mining in Alaska
Historic districts on the National Register of Historic Places in Alaska
Houses in Fairbanks North Star Borough, Alaska
Houses on the National Register of Historic Places in Alaska
Buildings and structures on the National Register of Historic Places in Fairbanks North Star Borough, Alaska
Company housing